Pickrell is a village in Gage County, Nebraska, United States. As of the 2010 census, the village population was 199.

History
Pickrell was laid out in 1884 when the railroad was extended to that point. It was named for William Pickrell, one of the original owners of the town site. Pickrell was incorporated as a village in 1913.

Geography
Pickrell is located at  (40.377846, -96.728806).

Demographics

2010 census
As of the census of 2010, there were 199 people, 84 households, and 56 families living in the village. The racial makeup of the village was 97.0% White, 1.0% Native American, 0.5% Asian, and 1.5% from two or more races. Hispanic or Latino of any race were 2.5% of the population.

There were 84 households, of which 32.1% had children under the age of 18 living with them, 59.5% were married couples living together, 7.1% had a female householder with no husband present, and 33.3% were non-families. 29.8% of all households were made up of individuals, and 14.3% had someone living alone who was 65 years of age or older. The average household size was 2.37 and the average family size was 2.95.

The median age in the village was 36.8 years. 28.1% of residents were under the age of 18; 3% were between the ages of 18 and 24; 29.7% were from 25 to 44; 19.5% were from 45 to 64; and 19.6% were 65 years of age or older. The gender makeup of the village was 51.3% male and 48.7% female.

2000 census
As of the census of 2000, there were 182 people, 78 households, and 53 families living in the village. The population density was 1,744.4 people per square mile (702.7/km). There were 86 housing units at an average density of 824.3 per square mile (332.0/km). The racial makeup of the village was 99.45% White and 0.55% African American. Hispanic or Latino of any race were 0.55% of the population.

There were 78 households, out of which 24.4% had children under the age of 18 living with them, 62.8% were married couples living together, 2.6% had a female householder with no husband present, and 30.8% were non-families. 23.1% of all households were made up of individuals, and 11.5% had someone living alone who was 65 years of age or older. The average household size was 2.33 and the average family size was 2.74.

In the village, the population was spread out, with 20.9% under the age of 18, 6.6% from 18 to 24, 29.7% from 25 to 44, 26.9% from 45 to 64, and 15.9% who were 65 years of age or older. The median age was 40 years. For every 100 females, there were 95.7 males. For every 100 females age 18 and over, there were 92.0 males.

The median income for a household in the village was $36,250, and the median income for a family was $54,375. Males had a median income of $35,417 versus $23,750 for females. The per capita income for the village was $16,997. None of the families and 9.7% of the population were living below the poverty line, including no under eighteens and 19.4% of those over 64.

References

External links
Community website

Villages in Gage County, Nebraska
Villages in Nebraska